The St Helens Star is a local delivered free within the borough of St Helens, Merseyside in England. The Star has been in circulation since 1973. The Star has a tough competition with the other newspaper in the borough, The Reporter.

Distribution
The St Helens Star is delivered free to 79,085 homes throughout St. Helens Metropolitan Borough. Distribution is audited every six months by the Audited Bureau of Circulation.

Ownership
The St Helens Star is published by Newsquest Cheshire / Merseyside, itself part of the Newsquest Media Group. The St Helens Star was first published in November 1973.

External links

 

Newspapers published in Merseyside
Newspapers published by Newsquest
Metropolitan Borough of St Helens